Mosby's Marauders is a 1967 American film about the raids by John S. Mosby during the US Civil War. It was originally filmed for US television under the title Willie and the Yank: The Mosby Raiders.

Cast
James MacArthur as Henry Jenkins
Nick Adams as Sgt. Gregg
Jack Ging as John S. Mosby
Kurt Russell as Willie Prentiss
Peggy Lipton as Oralee Prentiss
Donald Harron as Brig. Gen. Edwin H. Stoughton
Jeanne Cooper as Ma Prentiss
James T. Callahan as Sam Chapman
Robert Sorrells as Pvt. Starkey
E.J. Andre as Uncle Fred
Michael Forest as Gen. J.E.B. Stuart
Steve Raines as Sgt. Maddux
Michael Pate as Capt. Blazer
Michael Kearney as Homer Prentiss
Robert Random as Pvt. Lomax

References

External links
Mosby's Marauders at Letterbox DVD
Mosby's Marauders at IMDb

1967 films
1967 television films
American Civil War films
Films directed by Michael O'Herlihy
1960s English-language films
1960s American films